Gandurar is a rural locality (a selo) in Kilersky Selsoviet, Dokuzparinsky District, Republic of Dagestan, Russia. The population was 39 as of 2010.

Geography 
Gandurar is located 6 km southwest of Usukhchay (the district's administrative centre) by road. Kiler and Esetar are the nearest rural localities.

Nationalities 
Lezgins live there.

References 

Rural localities in Dokuzparinsky District